Torremenga is a municipality located in the province of Cáceres, in the autonomous community of Extremadura, Spain. It had a population of 603 inhabitants in 12 km. There are some Roman and Prehistoric remains and some typical porches with granite pillars. There is a Visigothic castle and a 17th-century church.

References

Municipalities in the Province of Cáceres